Hossein Farmani is a creative director, gallerist, exhibition curator, philanthropist and founder and president of the Lucie Awards in New York City, International Design Awards, Px3, Paris Photo Prize and LICC, London Creative Awards, Focus on AIDS and Farmani Gallery.

Early life

Farmani  was born in Tehran, Iran, and at age of 9 started acting in the local children's library theater.

Farmani moved to Los Angeles in 1975, and began his studies at Hollywood Academy in Hollywood, California. He studied cinema and photography at Orange Coast College.

Career
In 1984, he started VUE magazine, the first fashion magazine in Orange County, distributed around the world.

Farmani brought together Susan Baraz, Candace Falk, Robert Berman, Ron Bakal and Laura Hinds to start the Focus on AIDS Foundation to help create awareness and raise money to fund research and care. Focus on AIDS is a 100% volunteer group that has raised millions of dollars and funded many organizations. Over 500 photographers have donated works to the Focus on AIDS Photography Auction.

Farmani started the Foto-Folio Magazine, a photography magazine that is now in the permanent collection of the Library of Congress.

In 1987, Farmani started the Farmani Advertising Agency, and later acquired Yamanouchi and Associate Design Agency, and the Farmani Yamanouchi Design Studio (FYI Design) was established. 
 
In 2003, The Lucie was established by Farmani, and a Farmani Gallery in both Los Angeles and New York City were established.

Farmani also co-founded the Palm Springs Photo Festival, Snap Orlando, Month of Photography LA, and the Istanbul Photo Festival. In 2014, Farmani spoke at TEDxChiangMai. He also judged the Best Photo Essay at Yangon Photo Festival.

In 2015, Farmani founded the Lucie Technical Awards, to honor the people responsible for photographic technology.

2019, Farmani founded first and only permanent exhibition of Steve McCurry in Kashan called Steve's House. Hassan rowshanbakht and Hossein Rowshanbakht (twins) helped him with renovating and managing space.

2019, Farmani in cooperation with Twins (Rowshanbakht brothers) opened an art space in Kashan called Hashtcheshmeh; an old weave factory that renovated to art gallery.

2022, Farmani and Kashan Twins (Hassan and Hossein Rowshanbakht) opened House of Lucie in Kashan. House of Lucie is a permanent photo exhibition of photographers who won the Lucie Awards.

References 

Living people
People from Tehran
Iranian photographers
Year of birth missing (living people)